List of notable people from Kolkata, that is, people born in or associated with the city. Kolkata has been regarded as the cultural capital of India.

Poets and writers 
List of notable people

Philosophers and religious teachers
The most famous religious figure of Kolkata is, without a doubt, Mother Teresa. Others are (in order of surname):

Bhakti Hridaya Bon (1901—1982)
Bhakti Prajnana Kesava Goswami (1898—1968)
Rajendra Pillai (1968-)
A.C. Bhaktivedanta Swami Prabhupada (1896—1977), founder of ISKCON.
Ramakrishna (1836—1886)
Ram Mohan Roy (1772—1833)
Bhaktisiddhanta Sarasvati (1874—1837), founder of Gaudiya Math.
Keshab Chandra Sen (1838—1884)
Debendranath Tagore (1817—1905)
Bhaktivinoda Thakur (1838—1914)
Swami Vivekananda (1863—1902)

Scientists
List in order of surname.

 James Atkinson (1780—1852), surgeon, artist and Persian scholar.
Sir Jagadish Chandra Bose (1858—1937), Bengali polymath, physicist, biologist, biophysicist, botanist and archaeologist. 
Asima Chatterjee (1917—2006), chemist.
Debendra Mohan Bose (1875—1975), physicist.
Satyendra Nath Bose (1894—1974), physicist and polymath from Bengal.
Suniti Kumar Chattopadhyay (1890—1977), Bengali linguist.
Barun De (1932—2013), historian.
Brajendranath De (1852—1932), Indian civil servant and orientalist.
Anil Kumar Gain (1919—1978), mathematician and statistician.
J.B.S. Haldane (1892—1964), British-Indian scientist, known for his work in the study of physiology, genetics, evolutionary biology, and mathematics
Prasanta Chandra Mahalanobis (1893—1972), Bengali scientist and applied statistician.
R.C. Majumdar (1884—1980), historian.
P. J. Marshall (b. 1933), historian.
Subhash Mukhopadhyay (1931—1981), physician.
Sisir Kumar Mitra (1890—1963), physicist.
Rajat Kanta Ray, historian.
Amal Kumar Raychaudhuri (1923—2005), physicist, known for his research in general relativity and cosmology.
Tapan Raychaudhuri (1926—2014), historian.
C. R. Rao (b. 1920), mathematician and statistician.
Prafulla Chandra Roy (1861—1944), Bengali chemist, educationist, historian, industrialist and philanthropist.
Meghnad Saha (1893—1956), astrophysicist.
Sir Jadunath Sarkar (1870—1958), historian.
Sumit Sarkar (b. 1939), historian.
Susobhan Sarkar (1900—1982), historian.
Tapan Kumar Sarkar (1948—2021), electrical engineer.
Ashoke Sen (b. 1956), theoretical physicist.
Sanghamitra Bandyopadhyay (b. 1968), Computer Scientist
Sukumar Sen (linguist) historian of Bengali literature.
Upendranath Brahmachari
Ujjwal Maulik (b. 1965), Computer Scientist
R. D. Banerji archeologist

Gallantry Awards winners 
Ashoka Chakra

 Flight Lieutenant Suhas Biswas

Maha Vir Chakra

 Squadron Leader Madhavendra Banerji

Bankers and business people

Amar Kumar Bera
P. C. Bhattacharya, 7th Governor, Reserve Bank of India
Aditya Vikram Birla
Rama Prasad Goenka (RPG Group)
Sanjiv Goenka
Chandra Shekhar Ghosh (founder of Bandhan Bank)
Radhe Shyam Agarwal
Radhe Shyam Goenka
Rajat Gupta (b. 1948)
Nalini Ranjan Sarkar
Mati Lall Seal
Ellis Jacob  (founder of Cineplex Entertainment)
Tiny Rowland  (chairman of Lonrho from 1962 to 1993)

Freedom fighters
Sri Aurobindo
Benoy Basu
Khudiram Bose
Rash Behari Bose
Subhas Chandra Bose
Jogesh Chandra Chattopadhyay
Chittaranjan Das
Jatindra Nath Das
Bagha Jatin
Badal Gupta
Dinesh Gupta
Shyama Prasad Mukherjee
Bipin Chandra Pal
Sudhamoy Pramanick
Bidhan Chandra Roy
Ashoke Kumar Sen
Matangini Hazra
Maulana Abul Kalam Azad
Sisir Kumar Ghosh

Performing arts

Artists

Directors
Satyajit Ray, who won the Oscar for Lifetime Achievement in 1992, lived in Kolkata and is considered among the greatest directors of film history.

Other notable filmmakers from Kolkata include:

Nitin Bose
Buddhadeb Dasgupta
Anik Dutta
Kaushik Ganguly
Ritwik Ghatak
Gautam Ghose
Rituparno Ghosh
Hrishikesh Mukherjee
Srijit Mukherji
Shiboprosad Mukherjee
Aniruddha Roy Chowdhury
Tapan Sinha
Aparna Sen
Mrinal Sen
Manick Sorcar

Cinema actors 

Uttam Kumar
Utpal Dutt
Soumitra Chatterjee
Sabyasachi Chakrabarty
Dhritiman Chaterji
Tapen Chatterjee
Rabi Ghosh
Barun Chanda
Pahari Sanyal
N. Viswanathan
Chhabi Biswas
Karuna Bannerjee
Anil Chatterjee
Subir Banerjee
Roopa Ganguly
Uma Dasgupta
Saswata Chatterjee
Tarun Kumar
Anup Kumar
Ashok Kumar
Bhanu Bandopadhyay
Biswajit Chatterjee
Prosenjit Chatterjee
Jahor Roy
Kanan Devi
Sagarika Mukherjee
Swastika Mukherjee
Razzak
Dev, MP, actor and film producer
Jeet
Ruma Guha Thakurta
Ranjit Mallick
Mirza Abbas Ali
Suchitra Sen
Sushmita Sen
Moonmoon Sen
Riya Sen
Raima Sen
Reema Sen
Omar Sani
Victor Banerjee
Parambrata Chatterjee
Konkona Sen Sharma
Varsha Ashwathi
Abhishek Chatterjee
Tathagata Mukherjee
Monali Thakur, singer and actress.
Ankush Hazra
Yash Dasgupta
Bonny Sengupta
Nusrat Jahan, MP and actress
Mimi Chakraborty, MP and actress
Anirban Bhattacharya
Sayani Gupta

Theatre figures
Rudraprasad Sengupta, actor and director.
Sambhu Mitra, actor and director.
Girishchandra Ghosh father of Bengali theatre

Photographers

Indrani Pal-Chaudhuri
Benu Sen
Sunil Das
Sunil Janah

Composers

Jeet Ganguly 
Kabir Suman
Salil Chowdhury
Rahul Dev Burman
Shashi Preetam
Sachin Dev Burman
Bappi Lahiri
Shantanu Moitra
Pritam
Hemanta Mukhopadhyay
Nachiketa Ghosh
Sudhin Dasgupta
Shreyan Chattopadhyay
Anupam Roy
Anjan Dutt
Jaimin Rajani
 Pankaj Mullick
 Anil Biswas
 Nachiketa Ghosh
 Shyamal Mitra

Hindustani classical singers/maestros 

Ustad Allauddin Khan
Ustad Ali Akbar Khan
Pandit Ravi Shankar
Ananda Shankar
Ustad Vilayat Khan
Pandit Jasraj
Ustad Bade Ghulam Ali Khan
Pandit Bhimsen Joshi
Rashid Khan
 Naina Devi
Pandit Nikhil Banerjee
Ustad Amjad Ali Khan
Ustad Bahadur Khan
Pandit Ajoy Chakraborty
Anjan Chattopadhyay

Hindustani classical instrumentalists 
Jyoti Goho
Sourabh Goho

Other singers 

Dwijendra Lal Roy
Suprakash Chaki
K. C. Dey
Gauhar Jan
Pankaj Mullick
Kanan Devi
Kanika Bandyopadhyay
Suchitra Mitra
Hemanta Kumar Mukhopadhyay
Manabendra Mukhopadhyay
Manna Dey
Kishore Kumar
Sandhya Mukhopadhyay
Debabrata Biswas
Begum Akhtar
Usha Uthup
Indrani Sen
Ruma Guha Thakurta
Swagatalakshmi Dasgupta
Suman Chatterjee
Sachin Dev Burman
Anjan Dutt
Rupam Islam
Prashant Tamang 
Shayan Chowdhury Arnob

Contemporary Bollywood musicians 

Abhijeet Bhattacharya, playback singer.
Anupam Roy (b.1982), singer-songwriter.
Alka Yagnik (b. 1966), playback singer.
Arijit Singh (b. 1987), singer, music producer, recordist and music programmer
Babul Supriyo (b. 1970), playback singer, live performer, television host, actor and politician.
Kumar Sanu (b. 1957), playback singer.
Pritam (b. 1971)
Sagarika (b. 1970), playback singer and actress.
Shreya Ghoshal (b. 1984), playback singer.
Shaan (b. 1972), playback singer and actor.

Dancers
Prominent dancers of the city include:
Uday Shankar and his wife Amala Shankar
Mamata Shankar
Tanushree Shankar
Ananda Shankar
 Sadhana Bose
 Sharmila Biswas 
 Shila Mehta, classical dance artist, choreographer, teacher, and composer
 Rani Karnaa
 Rajeswari Vaidyanathan, Tedx Speaker, trainer, performer and choreographer

Magicians
Kolkata is the magic capital of India and has produced internationally famous magicians and performers, including:
P.C. Sorcar
P.C. Sorcar, Jr.
P.C. Sorcar, Young

Sports

Norman Pritchard, track and field, Olympic medallist (1900)
Richard James Allen,  hockey, Olympic(1928, 1932, 1936)
Leslie Claudius, hockey, Olympic medallist (1924, 1928, 1936)
Gurbux Singh, hockey, Olympic medallist (1964, 1968)
Vece Paes, hockey, Olympic medallist (1980)
Leander Paes, tennis, Olympic medallist (1996)
Sourav Ganguly, cricketer, former India national cricket team's captain, sports administrator, former BCCI president
Chhanda Gayen, mountaineer, first Bengali woman to summit Mount Everest
Pankaj Roy, cricketer
Laxmi Ratan Shukla, cricketer
Deep Dasgupta, cricketer
Rohan Gavaskar, cricketer (son of Sunil Gavaskar)
Manoj Tiwary, cricketer
Ashok Dinda, cricketer
Wriddhiman Saha, cricketer
Mohammed Shami, cricketer
Len Stubbs, former cricketer
Chuni Goswami, footballer
Gautam Sarkar, footballer
Shailen Manna, footballer, former India national football team's captain (guided India to Gold medal in 1951 Asiad)
Pradip Kumar Banerjee, footballer
Krishanu Dey, footballer
Sudip Chatterjee, footballer
Subrata Pal, footballer
Subhasish Roy Chowdhury, footballer 
Syed Rahim Nabi, footballer
Mehtab Hossain, footballer
Arnab Mondal, footballer 
Pronay Halder, footballer
Pritam Kotal, footballer
Narayan Das, footballer
Subhasish Bose, footballer
Mihir Sen, record swimmer
Jyotirmoyee Sikdar, track and field
Arjun Atwal, golfer
Surya Shekhar Ganguly, chess grandmaster
Dibyendu Barua, chess grandmaster
Sandipan Chanda, chess grandmaster
Deep Sengupta, chess grandmaster
Gobar Guha, wrestler
Manohar Aich, body builder, Mr. Universe 1952
Dipu Ghosh, badminton, Arjuna Award
Saurav Ghosal, squash player 
Jaidip Mukerjea, tennis player
Jagmohan Dalmiya, sports administrator
Pankaj Gupta, sports administrator
John Holman, cricketer
William Laidlay, cricketer

Nobel laureates
Six Nobel Prize winners have been associated with Kolkata:
Sir Ronald Ross (1857—1932) — Medicine, 1902.
Rabindranath Tagore (1861—1941) — Literature, 1913; first Asian to win the Nobel Prize.
Mother Teresa (1910—1997) — Peace, 1979.
Amartya Sen (b. 1933) — Economics, 1998.
 Abhijit Banerjee (b. 1961) - Economics, 2019.
 CV Raman - Physics

Ramon Magsaysay Award winners
The Ramon Magsaysay Award, sometimes called "Asia's Nobel Prize", is given "to perpetuate his example of integrity in government, courageous service to the people, and pragmatic idealism within a democratic society." Kolkata winners include:

 Mother Teresa (1910—1997) — Peace and International Understanding, 1962.
 Satyajit Ray (1921—1992) — Journalism, Literature, and the Creative Communication Arts, 1967.
 Gour Kishore Ghosh (1923—2000) — Journalism, Literature, and the Creative Communication Arts, 1981.
Mahasweta Devi (1926—2016) — Journalism, Literature, and the Creative Communication Arts, 1997.

Others

Laksmikanta Roy Choudhury (1570—1649), Brahmin scholar, social and political figure
David Hare (1775—1842), philanthropist and founder of many important and prestigious educational institutions of Kolkata.
William Carey (1761—1834), missioner and reformer.
Alexander Duff (1806—1878), missioner and reformer.
Ishwar Chandra Vidyasagar (1820—1891), philosopher, academic, writer, translator, entrepreneur, social reformer and philanthropist, a key figure of the Bengal Renaissance.
Rajendra Prasad (1884—1963), politician, the first President of India (from 1950 to 1962).
Samik Bandyopadhyay (b.1940), critic of Indian art, theatre and film.
Gayatri Chakravorty Spiv (b. 1942), scholar, literary theorist, and feminist critic.
Tanmoy Bhattacharya (b. 1958), politician.
Romita Ray (b. 1970), art historian.
Manny Elias (b. 1953), drummer, record producer, original drummer of the Tears for Fears

References

Kolkata